Haliotis rugosa, common name the many-holed abalone, is a species of sea snail, a marine gastropod mollusk in the family Haliotidae, the abalones.

Haliotis rugosa Reeve, 1846 is a homonym of Haliotis tuberculata Linnaeus, 1758.

Subspecies
 Haliotis rugosa multiperforata Reeve, 1846
 Haliotis rugosa pustulata Reeve, 1846 (distribution: off Madagascar and the east coast of Africa, to the Red Sea and east to Yemen)
 Haliotis rugosa rodriguensis Owen, 2013 (distribution: Rodrigues Island, Mascarene Islands, Indian Ocean)
 Haliotis rugosa rugosa Lamarck, 1822

Description
The size of the shell varies between 30 mm and 70 mm.

Distribution
This species occurs in the Western Indian Ocean from the Red Sea south through most of the eastern coast of Africa, and east to Réunion and Mauritius.

References

 Geiger, D.L. & Poppe, G.T., 2000. A Conchological Iconography. The family Haliotidae. ConchBooks, Germany. 1–135

External links
 Owen B. (2013) Notes on the correct taxonomic status of Haliotis rugosa Lamarck, 1822, and Haliotis pustulata Reeve, 1846, with description of a new subspecies from Rodrigues Island, Mascarene Islands, Indian Ocean (Mollusca: Vetigastropoda: Haliotidae). Zootaxa 3646(2): 189–193.
 

rugosa
Gastropods described in 1822